Todor Nikolov Panitsa (July 2, 1879 – May 7, 1925) was a Bulgarian revolutionary figure, active in the region of Macedonia. He was one of the leaders of the left wing of the Internal Macedonian Revolutionary Organization.

Biography 
Panitsa was born in Oryahovo, northwestern Bulgaria, a town located on the right bank of the Danube. He grew up in the family of Nikola Panitsa from Tarnovo and Mitanka Peltekova from Svishtov. Panitsa studied in Lom, where he was attracted to the Macedonian liberation movement. Later he remained an orphan and was raised by his uncle in Varna. Three years Panitsa served as a cavalryman in the Bulgarian army. At the end of 1902 he became an activist of IMRO. Then Panitsa joined the band of Nikola Pushkarov and participated in the Ilinden uprising as rebel in Skopje region. After the uprising he arrived in Varna, Bulgaria. In 1904 Panitza went back to Ottoman  Macedonia and joined the band of Mihail Daev.

The failure of the Ilinden Uprising reignited the old rivalries between the varying factions of the Macedonian revolutionary movement. After the split of IMRO in 1906 Panitsa revealed to Sandanski the prepared by Michael Daev, Ivan Garvanov and Boris Sarafov plot to kill him. So the leadership of the left wing of IMRO had decided to get rid of the leadership of the right faction. After the assassination of Daev, Panitsa, acting on Yane Sandanski’s order, organized and threshed the assassinations of Boris Sarafov and Ivan Garvanov in 1907.

During the Young Turks Revolution together with Yane Sandanski he cooperated with the Ottoman authorities and became  a member of one of the one left political parties in Ottoman Empire - People's Federative Party (Bulgarian Section). This party would like creatе a Balkan Socialist Federation, and Macedonian State as a part of that Federation. Federalist paramilitaries led by Sandanski and Todor Panitsa contributed to the Salonica expedition corps in 1909 organized by the Young Turks.

During the Balkan Wars he supported the Bulgarian Army operations in Macedonia, initially with the idea, to fight for autonomous Macedonia, but later fighting for Bulgaria. During the First World War, he was badly injured in the battles of the Bulgarian army against the French in Krivolak. Later he became a mayor of Drama, then occupied by Bulgaria. After the war the restored IMRO split again. In December 1921, left-leaning deserters formed the Macedonian Federative Organization, where Panitsa was active. The Bulgarian premier Aleksandar Stamboliyski started then a campaign against the IMRO after his visit to Belgrade in May 1921. At this point Stamboliyski decided upon an anti-IMRO guerrilla, entrusting the job to Panitsa and other federalists.  In the bloody battles that followed, Panitsa's federalists set out to destroy the IMRO, but it scattered them, after which Panitsa fled to Greece in 1922. In 1923, Stamboliyski himself was assassinated by the IMRO.

After the defeat of the Communist uprising of September 1923 in Bulgaria, the new government repressed leftist Macedonian organizations aided by the IMRO. Subsequently part of the fleeing from Bulgaria federalists placed themselves in Yugoslav service, joining the Association against Bulgarian Bandits. Panitsa who had moved meanwhile from Greece to Belgrade, served as advisor of this Association. Later he went in Vienna, where the rest of the federalist leadership was reassembled. Here they got into contact with the Comintern and Bulgarian Communist Party and Panitsa became a Soviet spy and an associate of the Military Department of the BCP.

In 1924, the Macedonian Federative Organisation, then headed by him, reached an agreement with the IMRO, the so-called May Manifesto. The revelation that Bulgarian ultra-nationalist organisation as IMRO, officially sanctioned such a separatist and communist-influenced document, caused uproar in its ranks. After the IMRO revoked the agreement, Panitsa and the federalists participated by the foundation of the pro-communist IMRO (United), that was accepted as a partner in the Balkan Communist Federation and was sponsored directly by the Comintern. Panitsa was alleged then by IMRO to have served foreign interests and was sentenced to dead. In 1925 he was killed by Mencha Karnicheva, an activist  of the IMRO's right wing in Vienna.

References

External links

1876 births
1925 deaths
People from Oryahovo
Members of the Internal Macedonian Revolutionary Organization
Internal Macedonian Revolutionary Organization (United) members
Bulgarian military personnel of the Balkan Wars
Bulgarian military personnel of World War I
Recipients of the Order of Bravery
Assassinated Bulgarian people
Bulgarian people murdered abroad
People murdered in Austria
Deaths by firearm in Austria
1925 murders in Austria